Events in the year 1897 in Germany.

Incumbents

National level
 Kaiser – Wilhelm II
 Chancellor – Chlodwig, Prince of Hohenlohe-Schillingsfürst

State level

Kingdoms
 King of Bavaria – Otto of Bavaria
 King of Prussia – Kaiser Wilhelm II
 King of Saxony – Albert of Saxony
 King of Württemberg – William II of Württemberg

Grand Duchies
 Grand Duke of Baden – Frederick I
 Grand Duke of Hesse – Ernest Louis
 Grand Duke of Mecklenburg-Schwerin – Frederick Francis III to 10 April, then Frederick Francis IV
 Grand Duke of Mecklenburg-Strelitz – Frederick William
 Grand Duke of Oldenburg – Peter II
 Grand Duke of Saxe-Weimar-Eisenach – Charles Alexander

Principalities
 Schaumburg-Lippe – George, Prince of Schaumburg-Lippe
 Schwarzburg-Rudolstadt – Günther Victor, Prince of Schwarzburg-Rudolstadt
 Schwarzburg-Sondershausen – Karl Günther, Prince of Schwarzburg-Sondershausen
 Principality of Lippe – Alexander, Prince of Lippe (with Prince Adolf of Schaumburg-Lippe to 17 July, then Ernest II, Count of Lippe-Biesterfeld, as regent)
 Reuss Elder Line – Heinrich XXII, Prince Reuss of Greiz
 Reuss Younger Line – Heinrich XIV, Prince Reuss Younger Line
 Waldeck and Pyrmont – Friedrich, Prince of Waldeck and Pyrmont

Duchies
 Duke of Anhalt – Frederick I, Duke of Anhalt
 Duke of Brunswick – Prince Albert of Prussia (regent)
 Duke of Saxe-Altenburg – Ernst I, Duke of Saxe-Altenburg
 Duke of Saxe-Coburg and Gotha – Alfred, Duke of Saxe-Coburg and Gotha
 Duke of Saxe-Meiningen – Georg II, Duke of Saxe-Meiningen

Colonial Governors
 Cameroon (Kamerun) – Theodor Seitz (2nd term) to 10 September, then Jesko von Puttkamer (5th term) from 11 September
 German East Africa (Deutsch-Ostafrika) – Eduard von Liebert
 German New Guinea (Deutsch-Neuguinea) – Curt von Hagen to 13 August, then Albert Hahl (acting) (1st term) to 11 September, then Hugo Skopnik (all Landeshauptleute of the German New Guinea Company)
 German South-West Africa (Deutsch-Südwestafrika) – Theodor Leutwein (Landeshauptleute)
 Togoland – August Köhler (Landeshauptleute)

Events
 10 May – The Handelsgesetzbuch (HGB) is passed by the Reichtstag. The HGB will come into force together with the Bürgerliches Gesetzbuch (BGB) on 1 January 1900.
 10 August – Rudolf Diesel builds his first working prototype Diesel engine in Augsburg.
 10 October – Chemists working at Bayer AG create a synthetically altered version of salicin which the company names Aspirin.

Undated
 David Hilbert unifies the field of algebraic number theory with his treatise Zahlbericht.
 The Daimler Victoria—the world's first meter-equipped (and gasoline-powered) taxicab—was built by Gottlieb Daimler in 1897.

Births

 9 January – Karl Löwith, German philosopher (died 1973)
 14 January – Hasso von Manteuffel, German general during World War II (died 1978)
 19 February – Willi Domgraf-Fassbaender, German opera singer (died 1978)
 2 March – Gurit Kadman, German-born Israeli dance instructor and choreographer (died 1987)
 8 April – Will Dohm, German actor (died 1948)
 9 April – Ernst Melsheimer, German lawyer (died 1960)
 19 April – Bruno Diekmann, German politician (died 1982)
 11 May – Kurt Gerron, German actor (died 1944)
 16 June – Georg Wittig, German chemist, Nobel Prize in Chemistry laureate (died 1987)
 5 July – Paul Ben-Haim (born Paul Frankenburger), German-born Israeli composer (died 1984)
 17 July – Max Knoll, German electrical engineer (died 1969)
 4 August – Adolf Heusinger, German general (died 1982)
 10 August – Nikolaus, Hereditary Grand Duke of Oldenburg (died 1970)
 30 August – August Bach, German politician (died 1966)
 28 October – Hans Speidel, German general (died 1984)
 29 October – Joseph Goebbels, German politician (died 1945)
 12 November – Karl Marx, German composer (died 1985)
 23 November – Fritz Steinhoff, German politician (died 1969)
 5 December – Gershom Scholem (born Gerhard Scholem), German-born Israeli philosopher and historian (died 1982)
 14 December – Thomas Dehler, German politician (died 1967)
 Full date unknown – Shimon Fritz Bodenheimer, German-born Israeli biologist and zoologist (died 1959)

Deaths

 19 February – Karl Weierstrass, German mathematician (born 1815)
 11 March – Daniel Sanders, German lexicographer (born 1819)
 3 April – Johannes Brahms, German German composer and pianist (born 1833)
 10 April – Frederick Francis III, Grand Duke of Mecklenburg-Schwerin (born 1851)
 11 April – Johann Nepomuk Brischar, German Roman Catholic church historian (born 1819)
 17 June – Sebastian Kneipp, German priest (born 1821)
 21 July – Amand Goegg, German journalist and politician (born 1820)
 8 August – Viktor Meyer, German chemist (born 1848)
 20 September – Wilhelm Wattenbach, German historian (born 1819)
 30 September – Leopold Auerbach, German anatomist and neuropathologist (born 1828)
 1 November — Ulrike Henschke, German women's right activist and education reformer (born 1830)

 3 December – Friedrich August Theodor Winnecke, German astronomer (born 1835)

References

 
Years of the 19th century in Germany
Germany
Germany